The Ontario Human Rights Commission (OHRC) was established in the Canadian province of Ontario on March 29, 1961, to administer the Ontario Human Rights Code. The OHRC is an arm's length agency of government accountable to the legislature through the Ministry of the Attorney General of Ontario.

The OHRC's mandate under the Code includes preventing discrimination through public education and public policy, and looking into situations where discriminatory behaviour exists. A full-time chief commissioner and a varying number of part-time commissioners are appointed by Order in Council. Staff of the OHRC is appointed under the Public Service of Ontario Act, 2006.

History
Since June 30, 2008, all new complaints of discrimination are filed as applications with the Human Rights Tribunal of Ontario (HRTO). However, OHRC has the right to be informed of applications before the HRTO, and receives copies of all applications and responses. The OHRC can intervene in any application with the consent of the applicant; the commission can also ask to intervene without the applicant's consent, subject to any directions or terms that the HRTO sets after hearing from the parties. The commission also has the right to bring its own application to the HRTO if the commission is of the opinion that the application is in the public interest.

Proposal for a national press council (2009)
In February 2009, in a report to the Canadian Human Rights Commission, the OHRC commented on the proposal to create a "National Press Council" that would serve as a national media watchdog. Unlike current press councils in Canada, membership to this proposed new council would have been required by all publishers, webmasters and radio and television producers. No other steps were taken to implement the proposal.

Commissioner Barbara Hall argued that a National Press Council would facilitate the protection of human rights without imposing censorship of the media, explaining that while the council duties would be limited to accepting complaints of discrimination (in particular, from what Hall described as "vulnerable groups") and requiring media outlets to publish counterarguments. However, the council would have no authority to censor media outlets.

Mary Agnes Welch, president of the Canadian Association of Journalists, stated that the current provincial press councils are "the only real place that readers can go to complain about stories short of the courts" but that they "are largely toothless and ineffective." However, she argued against a mandatory national press council, stating that:

The provincial ones don't even work, so how could we have a national one? And I know a lot of journalists who would take umbrage at essentially being in a federally regulated profession.... If on the crazy off-chance that there is some momentum behind this idea of a national press council, it won't be coming from journalists.

In an editorial, National Post strongly opposed the OHRC's proposal, arguing that a mandatory national press council "is merely the first step toward letting the Barbara Halls of the world decide what you get to hear, see and read." The Post  further argued that nobody "has the ability to judge which speech should be free and which not."  Barbara Kay also strongly opposed Hall's suggestion, stating that her experience with the Quebec Press Council (QPC) was evidence that press councils are abused by those wishing to suppress the discussion of sensitive or controversial issues.

In a speech to Ontario's Standing Committee on Government Agencies, Conservative author Mark Steyn criticized the proposal for a press council, arguing that “Free societies should not be in the business of criminalizing opinion.”

Report on the TPS and racial profiling (2018)
In November 2018 the OHRC published its "Interim report on the inquiry into racial profiling and racial discrimination of Black persons by the Toronto Police Service". The first introductory paragraph of the report reads: "Between 2013 and 2017, a Black person in Toronto was nearly 20 times more likely than a White person to be involved in a fatal shooting by the Toronto Police Service (TPS). Despite making up only 8.8% of Toronto’s population, data obtained by the Ontario Human Rights Commission (OHRC) from the Special Investigations Unit (SIU) shows that Black people were over-represented in use of force cases (28.8%), shootings (36%), deadly encounters (61.5%) and fatal shootings (70%). Black men make up 4.1% of Toronto’s population, yet were complainants in a quarter of SIU cases alleging sexual assault by TPS officers." The report was an effort to rebuild trust between a significant segment of Toronto society and its police services. The black community was not convicted that anything would change after the "damning report" appeared.

Chairs and chief commissioners
The commission's first director, appointed in 1962, was Daniel G. Hill.

Rosemary Brown was succeeded by Keith Norton, who led the Commission from 1996. 

Barbara Hall was Chief Commissioner from November 28, 2005, until February 27, 2015.

On February 19, 2015, the Lieutenant Governor in Council appointed Ruth Goba as Chief Commissioner of the Ontario Human Rights Commission on an interim basis for a period of three months, effective from February 28, 2015, and ending May 27, 2015, or when a new Chief Commissioner is appointed, whichever occurs first.

Renu Mandhane, former executive director of the University of Toronto law faculty's international human rights program, became Chief Commissioner in November 2015.

Ena Chadha, former chair of the Board of Directors of the Human Rights Legal Support Centre was appointed as the Interim Chief Commissioner in July 2020.

Chair
 Louis Fine (1962–1971)
 Daniel G. Hill (1971–1973) 
 Walter Currie (educator) (interim) (1974–1975)
 Thomas Symons (1975–1978)
 Dorothea Crittenden (1978–1982)
 Borden Purcell (1982–1988)
 Raj Anand (1988–1989)
 Fran Endicott (Sep 1992–Nov 1992)
 Catherine Frazee (1989–1992)
 Alok Mukherjee (interim) (November 1992–June 1993)
 Rosemary Brown (1993–1996)
 Keith Norton (1996–2005)

Chief commissioner
 Barbara Hall (November 2005–February 2015)
 Ruth Goba (interim) (February–October 2015)
 Renu Mandhane (November 2015–May 2020)
 Ena Chadha (interim) (July 2020 – Present)

Controversial cases

See also 
 Ontario Human Rights Code
 Human Rights in Canada
 Canadian Human Rights Act
 Section 13 of the Canadian Human Rights Act
 Court of Appeal for Ontario
 Supreme Court of Canada
 Canadian Islamic Congress human rights complaint against Maclean's Magazine

References

Notes

Citations

External links 
 

Ontario law
Ontario government departments and agencies
Human rights organizations based in Canada